Shah Nabi-ye Olya (also Romanized as Shāh Nabī-ye ‘Olyā; also known as Shāh Nabī and Shāh Nabī Bālā) is a village in Chah Salem Rural District, in the Central District of Omidiyeh County, Khuzestan Province, Iran. At the 2006 census, its population was 273, in 43 families.

References 

Populated places in Omidiyeh County